Kalle Katz (born 4 January 2000) is a Finnish football player for Ilves.

Club career
He made his Veikkausliiga debut for HJK on 28 July 2018 in a game against Honka, as a starter.

On 7 January 2019, Katz was loaned out for the 2019 season to RoPS. On 10 March 2020, he re-joined RoPS on loan for the rest of the year.

On 15 January 2021, Katz signed for Ilves.

International
He was included in the Finland U19 squad for 2018 UEFA European Under-19 Championship, but did not appear in any games.

Personal life
Katz is of Jewish descent. Finnish track and field athlete and Olympic gold medalist Elias Katz was his great-grandfather's cousin.

References

External links
 

2000 births
Living people
Finnish footballers
Finland youth international footballers
Finland under-21 international footballers
Association football defenders
Helsingin Jalkapalloklubi players
Klubi 04 players
Rovaniemen Palloseura players
FC Ilves players
Veikkausliiga players
Kakkonen players
Ykkönen players
Finnish people of Jewish descent